Stanway House is a Jacobean manor house, located near the village of Stanway in Gloucestershire, England.  The manor of Stanway was owned by Tewkesbury Abbey for 800 years then for 500 years by the Tracy family and their descendants, the Earls of Wemyss and March.

Stanway House, originally constructed in the late 16th and early 17th century for the Tracy family, is a Grade I listed building. The principal rooms are in a long south-facing range forming an L-shape with the hall, unlike the usual Tudor house plan of a central hall.  The north-east wing, remodelled in 1913 by Detmar Blow, was demolished in 1948.  The kitchen court was designed by William Burn in 1859. The Gatehouse was built in about 1630. The construction includes Guiting Yellow stone and some Jacobean mullions and gables.

The then Lord Neidpath, now the 13th Earl of Wemyss and March, has pursued a programme of restoration for a number of years. The house and grounds are open to the public on a limited basis each summer.

The estate
The gardens are Grade I listed on the Register of Historic Parks and Gardens. The estate brewery, an original Elizabethan feature has, with the permission of Lord Neidpath, recently been re-established.

Cutsdean Quarry, which is a nature reserve and designated a Key Wildlife Site (KWS) in the Cotswolds, is part of the Stanway Estate.

J.M. Barrie, creator of Peter Pan, was a frequent visitor during summers in the 1920s, until 1932.

The Long Canal was filled in around 1850 but was restored in the early 2000s, a necessary step to creating the current fountain, which was not an original feature of the estate. The mill pond was dredged and the eight ponds and the cascade were restored at about the same time.

The ancient tithe barn was built in about 1370 for Tewkesbury Abbey and restored in 1927. The Estate watermill, just outside the grounds, has been restored to full working condition and produces wholemeal and sifted flour.

Early history
The current earl recounted his understanding of the history of the property during a 2016 interview with the publication Cotswold Homes, as follows:

"The estate goes back to 715, we think. It was given to Tewkesbury Abbey by Odo and Dodo, two Saxons who lived in the Winchcombe area. Then in 1533 it was leased to Richard Tracy. Richard had a bee in his bonnet about the fact his father was declared to be a heretic after he was already dead, his body being dug up and burnt. So he became friendly with Thomas Cromwell, who was leading an anti-monastic campaign at the time. Cromwell – who was so powerful at that point - suggested the abbey lease the land to Richard and it was done within four days of Cromwell writing the letter."

Records from 1291 indicate that the estate had three corn mills and a fulling mill used for processing wool from the many sheep owned by the abbey. The latter was converted in the late 17th century to grind corn and is now the Stanway Watermill.

Another source states that the work on the House began around 1580 on the ruins of an earlier Tudor house, with construction commissioned by Paul Tracy, Richard Stacy's son. The triple-gabled Jacobean gateway was created by Paul's son, Sir Richard Tracy, in 1630. 
The water features were probably added by John Tracy who was the lord during 1724–35.

The fountain

Stanway House is also home to the Stanway Fountain, which was opened on 5 June 2004.

Family use and media
The house is the home of James Charteris, 13th Earl of Wemyss and his wife, drug policy reformer Amanda Feilding. It's also the family home of Fielding's son, Kensington and Chelsea London Borough Council’s deputy leader Rock Feilding-Mellen, who has been involved in the Grenfell Tower fire disaster. During some summer months, the property is open to tourists.

In the Jeeves and Wooster TV series, Twing Hall was filmed at Stanway House for the episode "The Purity of the Turf". Interiors for the 2004 film Vanity Fair were shot there.  It was also used for The Christmas Candle. In the Season 5 Episode 2 "The Labyrinth of the Minotaur" of Father Brown the house features as the home of the Malmort family, the location of the maze.

Parts of the 1996 television adaptation of Emma and The Libertine were also filmed here. In 2015 the television adaptation of Hilary Mantel's Wolf Hall also featured the building. The central character of Wolf Hall is Thomas Cromwell, who had historical links with Stanway House, mentioned above.

References

Notes

Other sources
 Gloucestershire: the Cotswolds, David Verey, Pevsner Architectural Guides: The Buildings of England, Penguin, 1970,  pp. 415–417.

External links

 Official website

Country houses in Gloucestershire
Grade I listed houses in Gloucestershire
Grade I listed parks and gardens in Gloucestershire
Historic house museums in Gloucestershire
Gardens in Gloucestershire
Fountains in the United Kingdom
Cotswolds
Clan Charteris
Stanway, Gloucestershire